Actinotus minor, commonly known as the lesser flannel flower, is species of flowering plant in the family Apiaceae and is endemic to New South Wales. It is a small, sprawling plant with grey-green leaves and white flowers.

Description
The flower is a cream-white coloured umbel,  in diameter.

Taxonomy and naming
Actinotus minor was first formally described in 1830 by Augustin Pyramus de Candolle and the description was published in Prodromus Systematis Naturalis Regni Vegetabilis. The specific epithet (minor) means "smaller".

Distribution and habitat
Lesser flannel flower grows in heath, open dry sclerophyll forests on sandy soils in New South Wales from Ourimbah, south to Milton and Robertson.

References

minor
Apiales of Australia
Flora of New South Wales
Plants described in 1830